Priya Malik is an Indian wrestler. She won the gold medal at 2021 World Cadet Wrestling Championship in 
Women's 73 kg.

Awards
 Gold medalist at 2nd Khelo India Youth Games, Pune (2019)
 Gold medalist at 17th School Games, Delhi (2019)
 Gold medalist at  National Cadet Championship, Patna (2020)
 Gold medalist at   National School Games (2020)
 Gold medalist at World Cadet Wrestling Championship, Budapest, Hungary – wrestling, 73 kg (2021)

References 

Living people
Indian female sport wrestlers
Year of birth missing (living people)
21st-century Indian women